Christmeister is the second studio album by Numb, released in 1989 by Lively Art. The album was re-issued in August 1990 by Oceana Records.

Reception
{{Album ratings
|rev1 = AllMusic
|rev1score = <ref name="allmusic">{{cite web |url=|title=Numb: 'Christmeister > Overview |publisher=Allmusic |accessdate=July 28, 2020}}</ref>
}}

Allmusic awarded Christmeister four and a half out of five possible stars. A critic for High Fidelity News and Record Review noted the complexity of the work, stating "the bass and percussion are kept busy throughout, forming a foundation for all manner of thrash-csquc touches - but it's too deliberate and 'crafted' to be written off as merely anarchic." Sonic Boom praised the album and said "there always seems to be as much going on in the foreground as there is in the background, which gives this album the illusion that it actually contains more music than it should."

Christmeister was rated one of the Top-10 most ‘important’ industrial albums by Alternative Press Magazine (in 2000).

Track listing

Personnel
Adapted from the Christmeister'' liner notes.

Numb
 Blair Dobson (musician) – Vocals, production
 Don Gordon – instruments, production
 David Hall – instruments, production

Production and design
 Ian Noble – additional percussion
 Patrice – photography
 Joe Payne – cover art, design
 Greg Reely – editing
 Anthony Valcic – production

Release history

References

External links 
 Christmeister at Bandcamp
 

1989 albums
Numb (band) albums